Winfred O'Neal Tubbs (born September 24, 1970) is a former professional American football player. A 6'4", . linebacker from the University of Texas, Tubbs was selected by the New Orleans Saints in the third round of the 1994 NFL Draft. He played seven National Football League (NFL) seasons from 1994-2000 for the Saints and San Francisco 49ers. He was selected to the Pro Bowl in 1998, and was named All-NFL (second team) in 1997.

Winfred Tubbs is perhaps best known for his appearance in the arcade football game NFL Blitz.

Tubbs, now an entrepreneur, writes a blog on finance and investing for MSN Money's "The Invested Life."

Notes and references

1970 births
Living people
American football linebackers
New Orleans Saints players
San Francisco 49ers players
Texas Longhorns football players
People from Fairfield, Texas